José Cornavaca (born 13 April 1956) is a Nicaraguan judoka. He competed in the men's half-heavyweight event at the 1976 Summer Olympics.

References

1956 births
Living people
Nicaraguan male judoka
Olympic judoka of Nicaragua
Judoka at the 1976 Summer Olympics
Place of birth missing (living people)